Sh-h-h-h-h-h is a 1955 cartoon directed by Tex Avery and produced by Walter Lantz. It was the fourth cartoon directed by Tex Avery at Walter Lantz Productions. This cartoon features the 1922 Okeh Laughing Record for much of its soundtrack. The short would be Avery's final Lantz cartoon, and last theatrical cartoon overall, as he would leave his career in theatrical animation.

Plot
A short, mild-mannered man, Mr. Twiddle, plays the congas in a nightclub jazz combo; the incessant noise (the horn players point their instruments directly at Twiddle's head) cause him to have nervous tremors, and he leaves in the middle of the act while the rest of the band continues to play. Later, his psychiatrist Dr. I. M. Jittery then tells him he is a "very sick man" suffering from "trombonosis" and recommends a relaxing trip to a quiet, secluded locale to restore his nerves. The doctor warns Twiddle that if he does not do so, he will blow up. So his wife (a nurse) makes travel arrangements.

Twiddle takes a plane to the Swiss Alps and checks in at the Hush-Hush Lodge, a mountaintop resort hotel which goes to great lengths to maintain absolute silence for its guests extending even to the desk bell, from which a little sign reading "DING!" pops out instead of audibly ringing. A porter (actually a bellboy) escorts Twiddle to his room, communicating entirely with written cards including one  reading "CHEAP SKATE!" after receiving a nickel tip.  Twiddle changes into a nightshirt and, heading for bed, accidentally kicks a stool with his bare foot. He stops himself from shouting and holds up a sign reading "ouch", the flip-side contains symbols indicating swear words. Finally, he settles in for a peaceful night's sleep, after glancing at a cuckoo clock on the wall - the pendulum reads "tick" and "tock" as it swings, and the cuckoo pops out with a sign indicating "coo coo" and the time.

Next door a pair of porters are seen moving in another guest's belongings, ominously including a trombone. Soon, the unseen neighbor begins playing, waking Twiddle. While he unsuccessfully tries to shut out the noise, a woman in the same room as the horn player starts laughing. Soon the musician, a deep-voiced man, starts laughing as well. Twiddle repeatedly attempts to ask the neighbors to be quiet, but is rudely and physically rebuffed each time (when Twiddle writes, "Will you please stop blowing that horn" the unseen neighbor says "Shut up!") he soon resorts to violent tactics himself: a club, a cannon, a bomb, and finally a safe suspended by a rope, but they backfire on him as well. The entire time, the noisy neighbors are unseen, except for an occasional hand.

Eventually Twiddle's nerves give out; on the verge of a nervous breakdown, he begs the hotel's manager to find a doctor. He is quickly taken back upstairs — to the room where the occupants are still laughing hysterically and playing the horn. Twiddle sees to his shock that his neighbors are Dr. I. M. Jittery and the nurse, who have been unaware that their own patient was next door. Twiddle boils into rage; Dr. Jittery reminds him of his nerves, but Twiddle explodes in a puff of black smoke. Dr. Jittery remarks to the audience, "People just won't listen to their doctor's advice". He and his wife carry on laughing maniacally and honking on the trombone over the end title card.

References

External links
 
 Video 

1955 animated films
Films directed by Tex Avery
Walter Lantz Productions shorts
1950s American animated films
1955 films
Universal Pictures short films
Universal Pictures animated short films
Silence
1950s English-language films